Beşiktaş Wheelchair Basketball Team is the professional wheelchair basketball team of Beşiktaş J.K., which is a Turkish sports club from İstanbul. The club plays their home matches at Süleyman Seba Sport Complex.

Current roster

Achievements

Domestic
  Turkish Wheelchair Basketball Super League:
  Winners (4): 2004–05, 2005–06, 2015–16, 2016–17

International
  André Vergauwen Cup:
  Winner (1): 2011
  Finalist (2): 2010, 2014, 2019
  Third Place (2): 2009, 2018
  Willi Brinkmann Cup:
  Winner (1): 2012

References

External links
Beşiktaş Jimnastik Kulübü Home Page 
 Besiktas Basketbol
 BJKBasket Web Portal

Beşiktaş Basketball
Sport in Beşiktaş
Wheelchair basketball teams in Turkey